Christophia dattinella is a species of snout moth in the genus Christophia. It was described by Ragonot in 1887, and is known from Tunisia and Israel.

The wingspan is about 18 mm.

References

Moths described in 1887
Phycitini